US Post Office-Newark is an historic post office building located at Newark in Wayne County, New York.  It was designed and built in 1911–1913 and is one of a number of post offices in New York State designed by the Office of the Supervising Architect of the Treasury Department, James Knox Taylor. The original, main block is a 1-story, five-by-three-bay building clad in stucco and executed in the Classical Revival style.  The large rear wing was added to the building in 1938–1939.

It was listed on the National Register of Historic Places in 1989.

References

Newark
Neoclassical architecture in New York (state)
Government buildings completed in 1913
Buildings and structures in Wayne County, New York
1913 establishments in New York (state)
National Register of Historic Places in Wayne County, New York